Shepard may refer to:
A common misspelling of shepherd
Alan Shepard, American astronaut and member of the Apollo 14 moon mission
Shepard, Alberta, Canada
Shepard, Missouri, a ghost town
Shepard (name)
Shepard tone, a sound consisting of a superposition of sine waves separated by octaves
Shepard Settlement, New York
Shepard Industrial, Calgary
Shepard's method, a form of inverse distance weighted interpolation
 George F. Shepard House, a historic home in Omaha, Nebraska
Blue Origin New Shepard, a crewed rocket that is being developed as a commercial system for suborbital space tourism.
Shepard State Park, a state park in the U.S. state of Mississippi
Commander Shepard, the protagonist of the Mass Effect video game series

See also
Shepherd (disambiguation)
Sheppard (disambiguation)

ru:Шепард